NOP2/Sun domain family, member 2 is a protein that in humans is encoded by the NSUN2 gene. Alternatively spliced transcript variants encoding different isoforms have been noted for the gene.

Function 

The protein is a methyltransferase that catalyzes the methylation of cytosine to 5-methylcytosine (m5C) at position 34 of intron-containing tRNA (Leu)(CAA) precursors. This modification is necessary to stabilize the anticodon-codon pairing and correctly translate the mRNA. NSUN2 is also localized on mitochondria and is capable of introducing post-transcriptional modifications in mitochondrial tRNAs.

Clinical relevance 
Mutations in this gene have been found associated to cases of Dubowitz-like syndrome.

Model organisms 

				
Model organisms have been used in the study of NSUN2 function. A conditional knockout mouse line, called Nsun2tm1a(EUCOMM)Wtsi was generated as part of the International Knockout Mouse Consortium program — a high-throughput mutagenesis project to generate and distribute animal models of disease to interested scientists.

Male and female animals underwent a standardized phenotypic screen to determine the effects of deletion. Twenty eight tests were carried out on mutant mice and fourteen significant abnormalities were observed. Homozygous mutants were subviable and had decreased body weights, length of long bones and decreased circulating glucose levels, numerous abnormal body composition, X-ray imaging, eye morphology and haematology parameters; males also had a decreased grip strength, a short upturned snout, and abnormal indirect calorimetry and plasma chemistry parameters. Males (but not females) were also infertile. 
In addition, heterozygote mutants displayed premature hair follicle exogen.

References

Further reading 
 
 
 
 

Human proteins
Genes mutated in mice